Salvador Millaleo is a Chilean and Mapuche lawyer, university lecturer and former advisor on indigenous affairs to the Minister of the Interior and Public Security. He renounced his role as advisor following Minister Izkia Siches' failed visit to Temucuicui in March 2022, where she was received with gunfire. He lives in Santiago but has family in Araucanía Region. He is a councillor of the Chilean Institute of Human Rights for the 2019–2025 period.

References

Living people
20th-century Mapuche people
21st-century Mapuche people
21st-century Chilean lawyers
Chilean lawyers
Mapuche lawyers
Year of birth missing (living people)